The Ekoparty is an annual computer security conference that brings together a variety of people interested in information security. The Briefings take place regularly in Buenos Aires, Argentina.

History
Ekoparty was founded in 2001 by Juan Pablo Daniel Borgna, Leonardo Pigner, Federico Kirschbaum, Jerónimo Basaldúa and Francisco Müller Amato. In addition to the talks, Ekoparty has different activities like workshops, wargames, Wardriving, Lockpicking challenges, and forensics challenges.

See also
 Hacker conference
 DEF CON
 Black Hat Briefings
 Chaos Communication Congress

References

External links
 Ekoparty homepage
 Beyond DEFCON, 15 Must see Hacking Conferences
 Browser Exploit Against SSL/TLS at Ekoparty 
Computer security conferences